Fisher is a suburb of Canberra, Australian Capital Territory, Australia located in the district of Weston Creek. Fisher was named after Andrew Fisher (1862–1928), coal miner, founding member of the federal parliamentary Labor Party and Prime Minister of Australia for three terms between 1908 and 1915 (ACTLIC, 2004). The theme for the street names in Fisher is Australian mines and mining towns (ACTPLA, 2003).

Geology

Laidlaw Volcanics pale to dark grey dacitic tuff is found though most of Fisher except north slice of the suburb which is Deakin Volcanics  red-purple and green grey rhyodacite  with spherulitic texture.

References

Suburbs of Canberra